Samuel Stephens (died 1794) was a politician and MP for St. Ives between 1752 and 1754. He was responsible for the building of Tregenna Castle.

In June 1762 he married Anne, the only child and heiress of Richard Seaborne of Hereford. He had a son, Samuel, who later also became MP for St. Ives.

References 

1794 deaths
Members of the Parliament of Great Britain for English constituencies
British MPs 1747–1754
Members of the Parliament of Great Britain for constituencies in Cornwall
Year of birth unknown